Plethodontohyla ocellata is a species of frog in the family Microhylidae.
It is endemic to Madagascar.
Its natural habitat is subtropical or tropical moist lowland forests.
It is threatened by habitat loss.

References

Plethodontohyla
Endemic frogs of Madagascar
Taxonomy articles created by Polbot
Amphibians described in 1926